Allison Bay 219 is an Indian reserve of the Mikisew Cree First Nation in Alberta, located within Regional Municipality of Wood Buffalo. It is 3 kilometers northeast of Fort Chipewyan. In the 2016 Canadian Census, it recorded a population of 127 living in 38 of its 46 total private dwellings.

References

Indian reserves in Alberta
Lake Athabasca